
Šakarvai Lake is in the Ignalina district of eastern Lithuania, Aukštaitija National Park, about  southwest of Palūšė village. The lake connects with Lake Lūšiai and Lake Žeimenys.

Sources

Sakarvai